Thomas Edward "Tom" Breidenthal (born March 3, 1951) is the former bishop of the Episcopal Diocese of Southern Ohio. On September 18, 2020, Breidenthal announced his retirement on November 29, 2020, citing health issues.

Early life and education 
Breidenthal was born on March 3, 1951, in Jersey City, New Jersey, to Leslie T. and Ruth Veach Breidenthal. He was raised in Europe and the Midwest until his family settled in Eugene, Oregon. He attended high school as a theater major at the Interlochen Arts Academy. He earned a B.A. from Portland State University and an M. A. in English Literature from the University of Victoria. He received his M.Div. from the Church Divinity School of the Pacific in 1981.

Ordination and Ministry 
Breidenthal was ordained a deacon in 1981 by Matthew Paul Bigliardi, Bishop of Oregon. He was later ordained a priest on June 12, 1982, by Bishop Bigliardi.

He has pastored or assisted congregations in Oregon, Oxford, England and New York, as well as serving as a high school chaplain. Breidenthal was an Episcopal Church Foundation Fellow at Oxford University being awarded the degree of Doctor of Philosophy in Theology. From 1992 through 2001 he was the John Henry Hobart Professor of Christian Ethics and Moral Theology at The General Theological Seminary in New York City. He then went on to serve as Dean of Religious Life and of the Chapel at Princeton University.

Episcopacy 
Breidenthal was elected the ninth bishop of Southern Ohio on November 11, 2006, at the diocesan convention, held in Vern Riffe Center for the Arts on the campus of Shawnee State University in Portsmouth, Ohio. He was later consecrated on April 28, 2007, at the Mershon Auditorium, Ohio State University in Columbus.

At the 2009 diocesan convention, Breidenthal announced that he would lift the ban on blessing of same-sex unions in the diocese starting in 2010.

On September 18, 2020, Breidenthal announced his retirement on November 29, 2020, citing health issues.

Personal life 
He has served on the boards of Kenyon College, Bexley-Seabury Seminary, in addition to various civic and ecumenical engagements. Breidenthal and his spouse, Margaret Garner Breidenthal, married in 1984 and have two adult daughters, Magdalene and Lucy.

Bibliography 
Christian Households: The Sanctification of Nearness (1997) 

Sacred Unions: A New Guide to Life-Long Commitment (2006)

See also
 List of Episcopal bishops of the United States
 Historical list of the Episcopal bishops of the United States

References

External links 
Thomas E. Breidenthal elected as ninth bishop of Southern Ohio

Living people
Episcopal bishops of Southern Ohio
1951 births